H. Anand (born 4 January 1984), popularly known as Master Anand, is an Indian actor, film director and television presenter. He is best known for his work in Kannada cinema. Anand made his acting debut as a child artist. His performance as Ganesha in the Kannada film Gauri Ganesha alongside Ananth Nag, Sihi Kahi Chandru and Ramesh Bhat was well received.

Career
Anand began his career as a child artist in Ravichandran's Kindarijogi. As a child actor, he was often credited as Master. His first rose to fame with the 2002 film Friends. He then turned to comedy with the 2010 television series SSLC Nan Maklu, which was telecasted on Asianet Suvarna. In 2011, he debuted as a film director with 5 Idiots. He later directed Paduvaralli Paddegalu, a TV series for Asianet Suvarna and Robo Family, a TV series for Colors Kannada. He was a participant in the second season of Dancing Stars, aired on Colors Kannada; he emerged as the winner in the grand finale. He has acted in over 60 films and has received various awards. He even tasted success as a host through Drama Juniors which was telecasted in Zee Kannada followed by Comedy Khiladigalu which was judged by Jaggesh, Yogaraj Bhat and Rakshita.

Personal life
Anand was born on 4 January 1984 to V Hariharan and B S Latha in Bangalore, Karnataka, India. He has a brother Arun who is also an actor. Anand acted in films like 'gajapade' and married to Yashaswini on 18 March  2010. The couple have a son and a daughter.

Awards and honours

 Karnataka State Award: Best Child Artist (Gauri Ganesha - 1991–92)
 Karnataka State Award: Best Child Artist (Thayi Illada Thavaru - 1994–95)
 Filmfare Award: Best Child Artist (Makkala Sakshi 1995–96)

Filmography

Films
 Gauri Ganesha
 Golmaal Govindam (Telugu)
 Belliyappa Bangarappa
 Shanti Kranti 
Kindari Jogi
 Muthina Haara
 Karpoorada Gombe
 Friends
 Devaru Varavanu Kotre
 Mani
 Preethigaagi
 Preetisle Beku
 Jyeshta
 Meera Madhava Raghava
 Sajni
 Hosavarsha
 Preethi Nee Heegeke
 5 Idiots (also director)
 Pyarge Aagbittaite 
 Bullet Basya
 Jaathre (special appearance)
 Machcha Baglako (also director)
 HagaluGanasu

Television shows

Reality shows

References

External links
 
 'A Comedian can be an All-rounder'

Living people
Male actors in Kannada cinema
Indian male child actors
Indian male film actors
Indian male television actors
20th-century Indian film directors
Kannada film directors
Male actors in Kannada television
Indian television directors
Reality show winners
Participants in Indian reality television series
21st-century Indian male actors
Male actors from Bangalore
1984 births
Film directors from Bangalore
Bigg Boss Kannada contestants